Kursk is an impact crater located in Kursk Oblast of the Central Federal District, Russia.

The crater is not exposed to the surface.

References 

Impact craters of Russia
Geology of European Russia
Carboniferous impact craters
Permian impact craters
Triassic impact craters
Jurassic impact craters
Landforms of Kursk Oblast